Beallsville High School is a public high school in Beallsville, Ohio, United States.  It is one of three high schools in the Switzerland of Ohio Local School District. Sports teams are called the Blue Devils, and they compete in the Ohio High School Athletic Association as a member of the Ohio Valley Athletic Conference.

History
On August 29, 2011, Beallsville High School began its 83rd and final year in the former high school building, which opened in September 1928. The current K-12 structure was opened in 2012.

On February 26, 2015,  the Switzerland of Ohio School Board voted to close the high school effective 2015-2016 school year, but the ruling was struck down in court, thus keeping the school open.

Athletics

OVAC Conference Championships
Baseball - 1996, 2001
Boys Basketball - 2003
Girls Basketball - 1982, 1993, 2002, 2004, 2009, 2010, 2019, 2020
Football - 1968, 1970, 1977, 1981, 1988, 1992, 1994, 2000, 2006, 2011
Golf - 1982, 1995
Softball - 1983, 2000
Boys Track - 1971, 1979, 2011
Volleyball - 2002, 2006, 2007, 2008
Wrestling - 1978, 1982, 1987, 1988, 2008

Notable alumni
Dustin Nippert - Former MLB player for the Arizona Diamondbacks & Texas Rangers

References

External links 
 School Website
 District Website

High schools in Monroe County, Ohio
Public high schools in Ohio
1928 establishments in Ohio